José Walter Williams Castillo (30 September 1983 – 11 December 2018) was a Honduran soccer player who played as a defender for several clubs in the Honduran Liga Nacional.

International career 
On 28 June 2013 he was called up to the Honduras national football team by Luis Fernando Suárez for the 2013 CONCACAF Gold Cup.  However, he could not join the team due to a visa problem.  Then on 26 February 2014 he was again summoned by Luis Fernando Suárez (in preparation for the 2014 FIFA World Cup) for the friendly match against Venezuela national football team in San Pedro Sula. He earned his first senior cap on 5 March, playing the first 46 minutes before being substituted by Bryan Acosta in the 2–1 win over the South Americans.

Death
Williams died on 11 December 2018 in La Ceiba at the age of 35 due to a stroke.

References

External links 
 Profile at Ceroacero 
 

1983 births
2018 deaths
Honduran footballers
C.D. Victoria players
C.D.S. Vida players
Atlético Choloma players
Parrillas One players
C.D. Real Sociedad players
C.D. Marathón players
Juticalpa F.C. players
Association football defenders
Liga Nacional de Fútbol Profesional de Honduras players
Honduras international footballers
People from La Ceiba